Karel Tůma (born 1885, date of death unknown) was a Czechoslovakian modern pentathlete. He competed at the 1924 Summer Olympics.

References

External links
 

1885 births
Year of death unknown
Czechoslovak male modern pentathletes
Olympic modern pentathletes of Czechoslovakia
Modern pentathletes at the 1924 Summer Olympics